The Supremes at Earl's All-You-Can-Eat is an upcoming drama film directed by Tina Mabry, and written by Mabry and Gina Prince-Bythewood. Based on the 2013 novel of the same name by Edward Kelsey Moore, it stars Uzo Aduba, Aunjanue Ellis, Sanaa Lathan, Russell Hornsby, and Mekhi Phifer.

Premise
A group of friends that call themselves The Supremes have experienced life together through the good and bad, and are now finding their friendship tested.

Cast
 Uzo Aduba
 Aunjanue Ellis
 Sanaa Lathan
 Russell Hornsby
 Mekhi Phifer
 Julian McMahon
 Vondie Curtis-Hall
 Kyanna Simone
 Tati Gabrielle
 Abigail Achiri
 Dijon Means
 Xavier Mills
 Cleveland Berto
 Ryan Paynter
 Raymond Greene-Joyner

Production
In December 2020, an adaptation of Edward Kelsey Moore's novel The Supremes At Earl's All-You-Can-Eat was in development, which will be directed by Tina Mabry, who also co-wrote the screenplay with Gina Prince-Bythewood. It will be a co-production between Searchlight Pictures and Temple Hill Entertainment. It was announced in July 2022 that Uzo Aduba, Aunjanue Ellis and Sanaa Lathan were cast to star in the film. In September, Russell Hornsby was added to the cast, with Mekhi Phifer joining the follow month. In October 2022, Kyanna Simone, Tati Gabrielle and Abigail Achiri joined the cast.

Filming began on October 12, 2022 in Wilmington, North Carolina. Production ran until mid-November. It wrapped up by November 11, 2022, with Dijon Means, Xavier Mills, Cleveland Berto, and Ryan Paynter having joined the cast.

References

External links
 

Upcoming films
American drama films
Films shot in North Carolina
Searchlight Pictures films